Buzuluk is a town in Orenburg Region, Russia, located on the Samara, Buzuluk, and Domashka Rivers,  northwest of Orenburg and  southeast of Samara.  Population:

History
It was founded in 1736 as the fortress of Buzulukskaya on the Samara River near the mouth of the Buzuluk River along Russia's southern frontier. It was later moved to its current place near the source of the Domashka River. It was granted town status in 1781.

An important development was the opening, in 1877, of the railway line connecting Samara with Orenburg.   Buzuluk was a principal stop along the line, and it is from this period that the town's first power station dates, along with its first schools and libraries.   Supported by the rail link and other new infrastructure developments, it now became an important rail-terminal for the transportation of wheat.   The population almost doubled between the end of the nineteenth century and 1926.

Buzuluk was the base of the First Czechoslovak Independent Field Battalion, the Czechoslovak army unit that fought alongside the Red Army during World War II when Czechoslovakia was occupied by the Germans.

Economy
Economic activity is now focused on the extraction and refining of oil.

Administrative and municipal status
Within the framework of administrative divisions, Buzuluk serves as the administrative center of Buzuluksky District, even though it is not a part of it. As an administrative division, it is incorporated separately as the Town of Buzuluk—an administrative unit with the status equal to that of the districts. As a municipal division, the Town of Buzuluk is incorporated as Buzuluk Urban Okrug.

Climate

References

Notes

Sources

External links
Official website of Buzuluk 
Buzuluk Business Directory 

Cities and towns in Orenburg Oblast
Buzuluksky Uyezd
Populated places established in 1736